The Carnegie Free Library in McKeesport, Pennsylvania, is a Public Library built with funds from Pittsburgh steel magnate Andrew Carnegie. McKeesport is located about 15 miles up the Monongahela River from Pittsburgh. The grant for this library was commissioned April 2, 1899. Out of approximately 1,688 libraries funded by Carnegie in America, McKeesport's was the 12th be commissioned. It was listed on the National Register of Historic Places in 1980.

References

External links
 Carnegie Library of McKeesport - official site

Library buildings completed in 1902
Libraries on the National Register of Historic Places in Pennsylvania
Libraries in Allegheny County, Pennsylvania
Carnegie libraries in Pennsylvania
Romanesque Revival architecture in Pennsylvania
Government buildings completed in 1902
Pittsburgh History & Landmarks Foundation Historic Landmarks
McKeesport, Pennsylvania
National Register of Historic Places in Allegheny County, Pennsylvania